Steven J. "Steve" Gallus is a Democratic Party member of the Montana Senate.  He represented District 37 from 2004 to 2012.  He was ineligible to run for re-election due to Montana's term limits.

Earlier he was a member of the Montana House of Representatives from 1998 through 2004.

References

External links
Montana Senate - Steve Gallus official MT State Legislature website
Project Vote Smart - Senator Stephen J. 'Steve' Gallus (MT) profile
Follow the Money - Steve Gallus
2008 2006 2004 Senate campaign contributions
2002 2000 1998 House campaign contributions

Democratic Party Montana state senators
Democratic Party members of the Montana House of Representatives
Year of birth missing (living people)
Living people
Politicians from Butte, Montana
University of Portland alumni